DalesBus is a network of bus services, which operate in and around the Yorkshire Dales, England. The network is managed by Dales and Bowland Community Interest Company – a volunteer-run subsidiary of the Yorkshire Dales Society.

History 
Dales and Bowland Community Interest Company has managed the DalesBus network of bus services since 2007. Initially, the company managed the operation of a single service between Ilkley and Skipton via Bolton Abbey, but has since grown significantly.
 
Services are funded by a number of organisations, including the National Trust, West Yorkshire Metro and Yorkshire Dales National Park, with additional support and funding from local community groups. These popular services carry increasing numbers of passengers, with over 30,000 passengers using the network in 2019/20.
 
Most services operate at weekends and on bank holidays, from Easter until late October, with some services operating year-round. Operated by low-floor single or double-deck buses, the network links major centres of population, such as Harrogate and York, with the Yorkshire Dales, allowing for walking or enjoyment without the need for a car.

Services and operators
As of 2022, the following services are operated under the DalesBus brand.

Controversy 
In 2015, North Yorkshire County Council withdrew English National Concessionary Travel Scheme payments for some of these services, regarding them as only for "tourist use" and therefore outside of statutory provision. In the following year, Lancashire County Council made the decision to follow suit, citing similar reasons to do so.

DalesBus Ramblers 
DalesBus Ramblers organise a varied programme of free guided walks in the Yorkshire Dales. All of the walks are accessible by bus or train, and are open to the general public.

In popular culture
In August 2016, route 830 (operated by Arriva North East), which runs between Richmond and Ingleton via Hawes, was the subject of an episode of television series BBC Four Goes Slow entitled All Aboard! The Country Bus. The episode saw a series record average audience of 800,000.

Notes

References

External links

Dales & Bowland CIC and (The) Yorkshire Dales Society on Companies House
 website

Bus operators in North Yorkshire
Bus transport brands
Transport in Yorkshire
Yorkshire Dales